Female is a 1933 Warner Bros. pre-Code film directed by Michael Curtiz and starring Ruth Chatterton and George Brent. It is based on the 1933 novel of the same name by Donald Henderson Clarke.

Plot
Alison Drake (Ruth Chatterton) is the wealthy owner and hard-driving, no-nonsense head of a large automobile company, inherited from her father. Her work has caused her to lose her youthful romanticism, and she has casual affairs with men, including her own employees.

Alison hosts a party at her mansion, but becomes fed up with the men out to either sell her things or marry her for her money. She dresses down and goes to an amusement park, where she picks up a man at a shooting gallery. They have fun together, but he refuses her offer to go home with her.

The next day, they meet again at her factory. To their mutual astonishment, he turns out to be Jim Thorne (George Brent), a gifted engineer she has ordered her underlings to hire away from her competition. Saying that she has no time now, Alison has him come to her mansion that night, supposedly to discuss his plans for the company in detail. She attempts to seduce him, but he rejects her as anything other than his employer.

Annoyed, she turns to her assistant, Pettigew (Ferdinand Gottschalk), for advice. He tells her that men want women who are softer and less independent, so she adjusts her tactics. She tricks Jim into a picnic and wears him down. In the end, he succumbs to her charms.

The next day, he shows up at her office with a marriage license, but she informs him that she likes their relationship just the way it is. Outraged, he quits.

Alison has another problem on her hands. Her company needs more financing to survive, but another firm is intent on taking advantage of the situation to take over and has gotten the local banks to turn her down. She sets up an appointment to meet with bankers in New York City, but then breaks down when she realizes that she cannot live without Jim.

She has the police track down which way he went and drives off after him. She eventually finds him (at another shooting gallery) and tells him that she is willing to get married. Then, he realizes that they can fly to New York in time to save her company. Even so, she tells him that he will run the firm, while she has nine children.

Cast

 Ruth Chatterton as Alison Drake
 George Brent as Jim Thorne
 Lois Wilson as Harriet Brown, a school friend of Drake
 Johnny Mack Brown as George Cooper, an employee Drake invites to her mansion
 Ruth Donnelly as Miss Frothingham, Drake's new secretary, after she decides that male ones are too distracting
 Ferdinand Gottschalk as Pettigew, Drake's office manager
 Phillip Reed as Claybourne
 Kenneth Thomson as Red
 Douglass Dumbrille as Mumford, one of Drake's car dealers, who proposes a sort of business merger
 Spencer Charters as Tom
 Robert Greig as James, Drake's butler (uncredited)

Production
Three directors worked on this film. William Dieterle began it, and William Wellman took over to complete it when Dieterle became ill. When Warner's production head, Jack L. Warner, decided he did not like an actor in the film, Wellman was not available because he had starting shooting College Coach, so Michael Curtiz was brought in to re-shoot with Johnny Mack Brown as the replacement. Curtiz ended up with the sole screen credit.

The film, which cost between $260,000 and $286,000 to make, and brought in $451,000 worldwide,
was made at Warners' Burbank studios, with exterior shots of Chatterton's house filmed at Frank Lloyd Wright's Ennis House in the Hollywood Hills.

Reception
Mordaunt Hall wrote that "although it possesses its reprehensible moments, it has the saving grace of having been produced with a sense of humor." He also approved of the performances of Chatterton, Brent and Gottschalk.

See also
 Pre-Code Hollywood

Notes

External links

 
 
 
 

1933 films
1933 romantic drama films
American black-and-white films
American romantic drama films
1930s English-language films
Films about businesspeople
Films based on American novels
Films directed by Michael Curtiz
Films directed by William A. Wellman
Films directed by William Dieterle
Films shot in California
Warner Bros. films
Films with screenplays by Kathryn Scola
1930s American films